Michael Akanji (born 1984) is a Nigerian of Yoruba descent. He is a Sexual Health and Rights Advocate. He was the director of The Initiative for Equal Rights (TIERs) and presently, Nigerians key population advisor for Heartland Alliance International.

Biography 
Michael Akanji was born in September 1984. He has studied at the Federal Polytechnic, Nasarawa,  Federal University of Technology, Minna and University of San Diego. He is a Sexual Health and Rights Advocate whose works focus on the LGBTQI  and HIV/AIDS. Michael works across the West African region. Michael has worked across board with different organizations including UN as a research member on the Young People Report  “UNGASS Declaration of Commitment on HIV/AIDS: Our Voices Our Future” project.

He was also a member of the Local Organizing Committee of the First National Conference on Inclusivity, Equality, And Diversity in University Education in Nigeria.

Michael is a 2015 fellow of the United States International Visitor Leadership Program. He is a co author of Through the Gender Lens and has been a contributor and coauthor of a number of publications.

References 

1984 births
Living people
Nigerian activists
Yoruba writers
Nigerian writers